Tomás Martins Podstawski (born 30 January 1995) is a Portuguese professional footballer who plays for Cypriot club Karmiotissa Polemidion FC as a central midfielder.

He began his professional career at Porto, where he made 107 appearances for their reserves and won the 2015–16 Segunda Liga, but never represented the first team. After a season at Vitória de Setúbal in which he was a Taça da Liga runner-up, he joined Pogoń Szczecin in 2018.

Podstawski earned 85 caps for Portugal from under-16 to under-23 level. He represented the nation at the 2016 Olympic tournament.

Club career

Porto
Born in Porto to a Polish father and a Portuguese mother, Podstawski joined FC Porto's youth system at the age of 13. On 20 February 2012, having not yet featured for the reserves, he was called up by first-team manager Vítor Pereira for the UEFA Europa League round of 16 second leg match at Manchester City, remaining unused in a 4–0 loss (6–1 aggregate) for the reigning champions.

Podstawski finished his first season with 24 appearances – 11 starts – helping Porto B to the runner-up position, although the team was not eligible for promotion. On 2 April 2016 he scored his first league goal in a 4–0 home win against Académico de Viseu FC, as they became the first reserves to win the second division.

Vitória Setúbal
On 12 June 2017, Podstawski signed a three-year contract for Vitória de Setúbal. He made his Primeira Liga debut on 6 August in a 1–1 home draw against Moreirense FC, and scored his first goal in the division on 30 October, consolation as a substitute in a 5–2 away defeat to Portimonense SC.

On 27 January 2018, Podstwaski was the only player to miss his penalty shootout attempt in the final of the Taça da Liga, lost to Sporting CP after a 1–1 draw in regulation time. He was also booked for handling the ball in his own box late into the game, which led to Bas Dost's equaliser.

Pogoń Szczecin

On 27 August 2018, Podstawski joined Polish club Pogoń Szczecin on a three-year deal. His maiden appearance in the Ekstraklasa occurred four days later, when he played the entire 1–1 draw away to Górnik Zabrze, and his first goal came on 27 October in a 3–0 home victory over Lech Poznań.

Stabæk
Having been without a club in the summer, Podstawski signed for Stabæk Fotball on 20 September 2021, for the rest of the year; the team from Oslo were in last place in Eliteserien.

Bnei Yehuda
Podstawski moved to Bnei Yehuda Tel Aviv F.C. of the Israeli Liga Leumit on 1 February 2022.

International career
At the 2014 UEFA European Under-19 Championship in Hungary, Podstawski captained Portugal to runners-up position behind Germany. He scored his only goal of 37 appearances for the team in the group stage, in a 2–1 win against Austria at Pancho Aréna.

Podstawski also acted as captain to the under-20 side at the 2015 FIFA World Cup, playing four games out of five in an eventual quarter-final exit in New Zealand. He had previously turned down an approach from the Polish Football Association.

Manager Rui Jorge included Podstawski in the under-23 team for the 2016 Summer Olympics in Brazil. He started every match, as the nation reached the quarter-finals.

Personal life
In parallel to his early professional career, Podstawski studied International Relations at the University of Porto. He speaks English and French, in addition to his native Portuguese and Polish. His parents were both involved in sport; his father as a Physical Education teacher and his mother as a professional gymnast.

Podstawski's younger brothers Filipe and António also became footballers, with the latter signing for Pogon's reserves during his time at the club.

Honours
Porto B
Segunda Liga: 2015–16

Vitória Setúbal
Taça da Liga runner-up: 2017–18

Portugal
UEFA European Under-19 Championship runner-up: 2014

Individual
UEFA European Under-19 Championship Team of the Tournament: 2014

References

External links

1995 births
Living people
Portuguese people of Polish descent
Portuguese footballers
Footballers from Porto
Association football midfielders
Primeira Liga players
Liga Portugal 2 players
FC Porto B players
FC Porto players
Vitória F.C. players
Ekstraklasa players
Pogoń Szczecin players
Eliteserien players
Stabæk Fotball players
Liga Leumit players
Bnei Yehuda Tel Aviv F.C. players
Cypriot First Division players
Karmiotissa FC players
Portugal youth international footballers
Portugal under-21 international footballers
Footballers at the 2016 Summer Olympics
Olympic footballers of Portugal
Portuguese expatriate footballers
Expatriate footballers in Poland
Expatriate footballers in Norway
Expatriate footballers in Israel
Expatriate footballers in Cyprus
Portuguese expatriate sportspeople in Poland
Portuguese expatriate sportspeople in Norway
Portuguese expatriate sportspeople in Israel
Portuguese expatriate sportspeople in Cyprus
University of Porto alumni